The 1938 Nevada gubernatorial election was held on November 8, 1938. Democratic nominee Edward P. Carville defeated Republican nominee John A. Fulton with 61.86% of the vote.

Primary elections
Primary elections were held on September 6, 1938.

Democratic primary

Candidates
Edward P. Carville, former United States Attorney for the District of Nevada
Harley A. Harmon, Chairman of the Nevada Public Service Commission
Charles L. Richards, former U.S. Representative

Results

Republican primary

Candidates
John A. Fulton
John A. Durkee

Results

General election

Candidates
Edward P. Carville, Democratic
John A. Fulton, Republican

Results

References

1938
Nevada
Gubernatorial
November 1938 events